The Quaid-e-Azam Library is a public library in located within the Bagh-e-Jinnah in Lahore, Punjab, Pakistan. The library was constructed in the mid 19th century during the British Raj and consists of Victorian era Lawrence and Montgomery Halls. The library has a collection of 125,000 books in English, Urdu, Arabic and Persian.

History 

The complex includes two halls, the first was built in memory of John Laird Mair Lawrence, 1st Baron Lawrence, and the second in memory of Robert Montgomery Martin. It was built in 1866 at the initial cost of Rs.108,000, contributed by the Punjab Chiefs and leading Lahore citizens. The conformity of style with the earlier building was ensured by G. Stone who, in order to present a single unified whole, linked the space between the two halls by a covered corridor. a park previously known as "Lawrence Gardens".

The original curved roof of the Montgomery Hall was disassembled and substituted in 1875 with a teak floor for singing and dancing. The roof was coated, stimulated and corrugated with a decorative carved wooden cling stunningly painted in Egyptian and Italian patterns and fitted with glass windows. On May 1, 1878, the services of the halls, library and the reading room officially got the name of “Lahore and Mian Mir Institute.” The amenities, particularly the elitism of the place, turned it into a club where the people started getting registered as members. The name was changed to “Lahore Gymkhana Club” on January 23, 1906.

In January 1972, the Lahore Gymkhana Club was shifted to Upper Mall and the building  became an academy for administrative training by the government of Pakistan only to on May 17, 1981, renovation of the building was started to turn it into a public library. On December 25, 1984, the then President General Muhammad Zia-ul-Haq officially inaugurated the Quaid-e-Azam Library.

In 2013, the government constructed two basements on the western and eastern sides of the library to add 20,000 sq. meters of reading space.

Today, The Quaid-e-Azam Library is an autonomous body functioning under a board of governors headed by CM.

Architecture 
The complex included two halls, namely the Montgomery Hall and Lawrence Hall. They are built in the neoclassical style.

The original features of the Old Gymkhana building were restored after extensive labor. The library presents an attractive look after renovation. Library has now capacity for 1000 readers and storage space for more than 300,000 lac books, after the construction of two basements. The floor area of the building including basement is spanned over 70,000 sq. ft.

Library 
As of 2022, the library has 141,000 volumes, both in English and Urdu languages. Nearly three thousand books are added to the library annually. It has more than 17,000 people enrolled as the members of the library. The Lawrence Hall is normally used as an assembly room for public meetings and theatrical and musical amusements. Nearly 19,000 people visit the library annually. It is a non-lending library.

Services at QAL 

Computer Lab

A computer lab consisting of 50 latest computers is providing internet, e-mail, educational downloads, HEC digital resources, and other information to the members of library. All services including usage of computer and internet are free of cost. The computer lab has been serving as a resource center for reference materials to scholars, researchers and graduate students of colleges and universities across the country.

CSS Study Room
A separate room is reserved for the members who are willing to appear in Central Superior Services, Provincial Management Services or other competitive examinations. This room contains a special collection of books for preparation. Multiple copies of books related to syllabus are placed in this section for the convenience of members.

Printing and Photocopy

Printing and photocopy facility is available in the computer lab. However, the members have to pay nominal charges to avail these services. Printouts can be obtained by paying Rs. 5/- per page. The photocopy charges are charged on subsidized rates.

Cafeteria

Near the main entrance of the library, there is a cafeteria. The cafeteria serves the members as well as the library staff on demand. The members who stay long time in the library this is a blessing for them to just eat and study.

Hall on Rent

Iqbal Hall with a capacity of 150 seats is available on rent for conducting various functions in the library. However, those programs, lectures, seminars, conferences, and workshops support education and our values. Iqbal Hall can be booked with the permission of Secretary BOG in written. Some relaxation may be given in fee for these programs. The commercial photography and filmy shooting is also allowed with the permission of authorities.

List of Newspapers

Quaid-e-Azam Library is spending a lot of money on maintaining a huge collection of newspapers for its members and readers. Approved List of Newspapers 2021 (Foreign + Local) 

Comfortable Sitting

Quaid-e-Azam Library provides the best environment to sit and study. To attain this comfort, arrangements  have been made for uninterrupted power supply in case of electricity failure by installing a solar system in the library. A separate common room is available for ladies for their convenience. Library also entertains those members who want to study their personal books in the library. The room for personal books study is besides the main entrance gate.

Request for a Book

Members can request for books if it is not available in the library. They just need to get a form from acquisition section and submit the duly filled form to Acquisition Incharge.

Praying Place

A separate place in Molvi Abdul Haq Hall is reserved as a praying place.	 

Kindle Device (On Demand)

Members can request for Kindle Device available at computer section for the study of books in soft form. The mentioned device contains about 5,000 books in it already.

Senior Citizen Membership

Quaid-e-Azam Library award Senior Citizen Membership free of cost to all Pakistanis whom age is 60 years and fulfill the requirements of membership.

Newspaper Clippings

A database is maintained on 150 hot issues. All articles on the topics which published in the newspapers are incorporated in this database. A soft copy may be provided to members on demand.

Archive Material

Library preserves two newspapers, Dawn since 2003 and Nation since 1992 in bounded volumes.

Suggestion Register

Library considers the suggestions and complaints of its valuable members. This job is done by placing a register in main hall of library where members can grace it with their suggestions.

Security Measures

Two Security Officers have been employed for checking entry passes, looking after the visitors, preventing losses, thefts and pilferage. They will also act as Fire Prevention Officers. Moreover, security cameras have also been installed within and around the library building.

See also 

List of libraries in Lahore
List of libraries in Pakistan

References

Libraries in Lahore
The Mall, Lahore
Memorials to Muhammad Ali Jinnah